Jackson oil field is the largest onshore oil field in Australia.

Jackson oil plant is an oil processing facility near the field. It processes oil from several oil fields in the Eromanga Basin and Cooper Basins.

The field was discovered in 1981 and contains 350 million barrels of oil, of which just under one third is recoverable.

References

Fuels infrastructure in Australia
Oil fields of Australia
Energy in Queensland